Chepkorio is a village in Kenya's Rift Valley. It's located in Keiyo South Constituency, Elgeyo-Marakwet County. It lies on the B54 highway, to the northwest of Kaptagat.

It is the home village of professional long-distance runner Geoffrey Kamworor.

References 

Populated places in Rift Valley Province